Fedoseyevskaya is a rural locality (a stanitsa) in Popovskoye Rural Settlement, Kumylzhensky District, Volgograd Oblast, Russia. The population was 48 as of 2010.

Geography 
Fedoseyevskaya is located in forest steppe, on Khopyorsko-Buzulukskaya Plain, on the bank of the Khopyor River, 56 km northwest of Kumylzhenskaya (the district's administrative centre) by road. Filyaty is the nearest rural locality.

References 

Rural localities in Kumylzhensky District
Don Host Oblast